Box kite spiders (Isoxya) is a genus of Afrotropical orb-weaver spiders first described by Eugène Simon in 1885. Like the spiny orb-weavers they have six prominent (but short) spines on their abdomen. They have a sclerotised (or porcelain-like) abdomen which is typical of the Gastricanthinae.

Species
 it contains sixteen species:
Isoxya basilewskyi Benoit & Emerit, 1975 – Rwanda, Congo
Isoxya cicatricosa (C. L. Koch, 1844) – Central, East, Southern Africa, Yemen
Isoxya cowani (Butler, 1883) – Madagascar
Isoxya mahafalensis Emerit, 1974 – Madagascar
Isoxya milloti Emerit, 1974 – Madagascar
Isoxya mossamedensis Benoit, 1962 – Angola
Isoxya mucronata (Walckenaer, 1841) – Central, Southern Africa
Isoxya nigromutica (Caporiacco, 1939) – East Africa
Isoxya penizoides Simon, 1887 – West, Central, East Africa
Isoxya reuteri (Lenz, 1886) – Madagascar
Isoxya semiflava Simon, 1887 – West, Central Africa
Isoxya somalica (Caporiacco, 1940) – Somalia
Isoxya stuhlmanni (Bösenberg & Lenz, 1895) – Central, East, Southern Africa
Isoxya tabulata (Thorell, 1859) – Central, East, Southern Africa
Isoxya testudinaria (Simon, 1901) – West, Central, East Africa
Isoxya yatesi Emerit, 1973 – South Africa

References

External links

Araneidae
Spiders of Africa
Taxa named by Eugène Simon